Malinda Grace Brumfield White (born April 1967) is an American businesswoman and Republican member of the Louisiana House of Representatives. She formerly ran as an independent and as a Democrat.

In the primary election held on October 24, 2015, White defeated a single opponent, fellow Democrat Chuck Nassauer, 5,906 votes (54.8 percent) to Nassauer's 4,868 (45.2 percent) to claim the seat vacated by Ritchie.

In 2002 she became a certified facilitator of Achieve Global Leadership Curriculum.

She is a former member of the Bogalusa City Council, the founder and chairwoman of the Bogalusa Blues and Heritage Festival, the founding member of the Bogalusa Gospel Music Festival. White has also served as a member of several civic organizations including, Youth Service Bureau of Washington & St. Tammany Parish, Court Appointed Special Advocate, Washington Parish Poole's Bluff Nature Trail Advisory Council, the Bogalusa Parks, Recreational, and Culture Commission, the Bogalusa Civic League, the Washington Parish Fair Board, Cassidy Park Museums Board, Washington Parish Commission on Human Services, and Washington Parish Economic Development Foundation.

On June 9, 2021, State Representative Alan Seabaugh of Shreveport accused White of threatening to shoot him with a gun during a dispute over a domestic-abuse bill under consideration. White later apologized, saying "she made comments to him in the heat of the moment that she should not have". White withdrew the bill the next day.

On July 1, 2021, White left the Democratic party and switched her registration to "no party."

On June 14, 2022, White switched her party affiliation from "no party" to Republican.

References

1967 births
Living people
Southeastern Louisiana University alumni
People from Bogalusa, Louisiana
People from Rocky Mount, North Carolina
Members of the Louisiana House of Representatives
Louisiana city council members
Louisiana Democrats
Louisiana Independents
Louisiana Republicans
Businesspeople from Louisiana
American real estate businesspeople
Baptists from Louisiana
Women city councillors in Louisiana
Women state legislators in Louisiana
21st-century American politicians
21st-century American women politicians
Baptists from North Carolina